Ozor is a surname. Notable people with the surname include:

 Florence Ozor (born 1980), Nigerian activist and businesswoman
 Michael Ozor (born 1988), Nigerian footballer

See also
 Odor (surname)

Igbo-language surnames